There are over 20,000 Grade II* listed buildings in England. This page is a list of these buildings in the district of Craven in North Yorkshire.

List of buildings

|}

See also
 Grade II* listed buildings in North Yorkshire
 Grade II* listed buildings in Selby (district)
 Grade II* listed buildings in Harrogate (borough)
 Grade II* listed buildings in Richmondshire
 Grade II* listed buildings in Hambleton
 Grade II* listed buildings in Ryedale
 Grade II* listed buildings in Scarborough (borough)
 Grade II* listed buildings in City of York
 Grade II* listed buildings in Redcar and Cleveland
 Grade II* listed buildings in Middlesbrough (borough)
 Grade I listed buildings in Craven

Notes

External links

 
Grade II* listed buildings in Craven
Lists of Grade II* listed buildings in North Yorkshire